Dominion 6.6 in Osaka-jo Hall was a professional wrestling event promoted by New Japan Pro-Wrestling (NJPW). The event took place on June 7, 2021, in Osaka, Osaka, at the Osaka-jō Hall and is the thirteen event under the Dominion name and seventh in a row to take place at the Osaka-jō Hall.

The event was originally planned to take place on June 6, but was postponed to the following day due to the state of emergency in Japan because of the COVID-19 pandemic, although the name of the event was not changed. In the main event, Shingo Takagi defeated Kazuchika Okada to win the vacant IWGP World Heavyweight Championship. In other prominent matches, Kota Ibushi defeated Jeff Cobb, and El Desperado defeated Yoh to retain the IWGP Junior Heavyweight Championship.

Production

Background 
Since 2020, NJPW has unable to run events with a full arena capacity due to COVID-19 restrictions. The event was originally scheduled to take place on June 6 but was postponed to June 7, due to the state of emergency.

Storylines 
Dominion 6.6 in Osaka-jo Hall will feature professional wrestling matches that involved different wrestlers from pre-existing scripted feuds and storylines. Wrestlers portrayed villains, heroes, or less distinguishable characters in the scripted events that built tension and culminated in a wrestling match or series of matches.

On night 2 at Wrestling Dontaku, IWGP World Heavyweight Champion Will Ospreay successfully defended the title against Shingo Takagi. Ospreay was planned to defend the championship against Kazuchika Okada at Wrestle Grand Slam in the Tokyo Dome but the event was postponed due to the state of emergency. On May 20, Ospreay vacated the IWGP World Heavyweight Championship due to a neck injury. During Road to Wrestling Grand Slam both Takagi and Okada challenged for the vacant title. The match between Okada and Takagi for the vacant title was scheduled for Dominion.

Results

References

External links
The official New Japan Pro-Wrestling website

2021
2021 in professional wrestling
Events in Osaka
June 2021 events in Japan
Professional wrestling in Osaka
Sports events postponed due to the COVID-19 pandemic